Saa Boo Thiri is a 2009 Tamil language romantic comedy film directed by Arshad Khan. The film stars Akshay, Prajin and Arshad Khan, with Mithuna, Pinky, Sara Alambara, Aksha Sudari and Ujjayinee Roy playing supporting roles. The film, produced by Rajesh Kanna, had musical score by Abbas Rafi and was released on 6 November 2009.

Plot

The film revolves around three youngsters: Balakrishna (Akshay), Keerthi (Prajin) and Pal (Arshad Khan) who live in the same apartment complex and are good friends. After two years of struggle, Balakrishna finally declares his love for TV reporter Sherin (Pinky) and she spontaneously accepts. Keerthi and Jo (Sara Alambara) are a married couple of IT professionals; they were madly in love with each other before getting married, but are now barely able to communicate normally thus creating various misunderstandings. Pal is a college student who hates women of his age and he is only attracted to aunties.

Balakrishnan's family forces Balakrishnan to see the bride Lekha (Mithuna) but Balakrishnan refuses to marry her because he is in love with Sherin. Lekha nimbly becomes friends with him and Sherin. After a trip to Pondicherry, which Sherin missed, Balakrishnan gets closer to Lekha and they eventually fall in love with each other. Tired of their marriage, Keerthi and Jo end up chatting with strangers on the net. Pal falls under the spell of the elder woman Philomina (Ujjayinee Roy) while his classmate Priya (Aksha Sudari) is secretly in love with him.

Lekha then decides to marry a groom chosen by her parents whereas Sherin dumps Balakrishnan when she learns about their love affair. Pal learns that Philomina eloped with her boyfriend; he is distraught but when Priya reveals her love to him, he promptly accepts her love. Lekha, who cannot forget Balakrishna, later cancels her marriage and marries her sweetheart Balakrishnan at the registrar office in a hurry. Keerthi and Jo forgive each other and they make up after the misunderstanding. The film ends with three couples living happily.

Cast

Akshay as Balakrishnan
Prajin as Keerthi
Arshad Khan as Pal (Palaniappa)
Mithuna as Lekha
Pinky as Sherin
Sara Alambara as Jo
Aksha Sudari as Priya
Ujjayinee Roy as Philomina
Rishwanth
Gayathri
Lavanya as Shanthi

Production

Debutante director Arshad Khan, had previously been an assistant director for films such as Manathodu Mazhaikalam (2006) and Yavarum Nalam, besides having made many ad films. He said, "It has in its place equal measure of both romance and comedy". Arshad Khan made his acting debut with the film alongside newcomers Akshay and Rishwanth, and TV actor Prajin made his big screen debut. Mithuna, Pinky, Sara Alambara, the Srilankan actress Aksha Sudari and playback singer Ujjayinee Roy form the female cast. Abbas Rafi, an associate of A. R. Rahman and A. R. Reihana, had tuned melodies for the film.

Soundtrack

The film score and the soundtrack were composed by Abbas Rafi. The soundtrack, released in 2009, features 6 tracks with lyrics written by Na. Muthukumar, Thamarai and Kavinba. A critic stated, " This composer has good potential, as can be seen from the way he has handled a single raga (Karaharapriya) in different srutis without sounding boring or repetitive. Good use of guitars too, especially bass guitars. The album is likely to create a flutter".

Release
Censor Board officials were disquieted witnessing the sequences where Arshad falls in love with a married woman. As it evokes denial amongst the Tamil film audiences and nearly 12 scenes of those sequences have been delivered and Censor Board officials have passed 'A' certificate. Initially, the film had its release date fixed on 16 October 2009, coinciding with Diwali, but it was released on 6 November 2009.

Critical reception
Sify rated the film as "Waste of time" and said, "The trouble with the film is that there is no story to tell, it is just a few incidents strung together by a non happening script [..] The film lacks a true Tamil touch and offers little in terms of surprise or twists. The music is bad and the second half is repetitive and too long with a predictable climax, and all is well with the jolly good guys and girls". S. R. Ashok Kumar of The Hindu wrote, "Since the line-up of actors in this R Studio's film consists mostly of newcomers, director Arshad Khan should have spent more time working on the script" and criticised the 'wafer-thin' plot and weak screenplay. Another critic stated, "Had Arshad Khan infused more pace and cut down the crude dialogues in the name of humour, 'Sa Boo Three' would have a game that everyone would want to play their hands with".

Box office
The film took a below average opening at the Chennai box office, beginning in the fifth position the first week and finishing in the sixth position the second week.

References

2009 films
2000s Tamil-language films
Indian romantic comedy films
2009 directorial debut films
2009 romantic comedy films